The 1972 Asian Champion Club Tournament was to be the fifth edition of the annual Asian club football competition organised by the Asian Football Confederation (AFC). Seven clubs from seven countries were to compete in the tournament, which was to be held in Tehran, Iran in April 1972. The seven clubs were split into two groups, with the group winners and the runners-up set to advance to the semifinals.

However, before the start of the tournament, Kuwaiti club Al-Qadsia and Lebanese club Racing Beirut refused to commit to playing against Israeli club Maccabi Netanya for political reasons if the situation arose. The AFC excluded both teams to avoid any repeat of what had happened in 1970 (a semi-final) and 1971 (a group match and the final), where Arab clubs had forfeited against Israeli clubs. Furthermore, Hong Kong Rangers were forced to withdraw at short notice due to logistical and financial problems.

With only four teams remaining, the FFIRI no longer considered it viable to invest its share of the money (including half of each team's flight expenses to and from Tehran) and resources required for the tournament due to the likely financial losses.

On 2 April 1972, the AFC informed the remaining teams that the competition was postponed, and it was eventually cancelled.

Participants
The seven clubs originally scheduled to participate were:

Groups
The draw for the groups had split the seven teams into two groups (one group of three, one group of four) prior to the tournament's cancellation, with the top two from each group to advance to the semi-finals.

Group A

Group B

References

1
1972
Cancelled association football competitions
1972
Asian Champion Club Tournament, 1972